The Institute of World Economy and International Relations, or IMEMO, is a leading independent research institute based in Moscow, Russia. On August 2015 the Institute has changed its name to the Primakov Institute of World Economy and International Relations to commemorate the name of its former director academician Yevgeny Primakov, who led the Institute from 1985 till 1989.

Founded in 1956 as a successor to the earlier Institute of World Economy and Politics (1925–1948), the institute is a non-profit organization acting within the Charter of the Russian Academy of Sciences. Soon after the establishment, the Institute gained the reputation of an important center of integrated fundamental and applied socio-economic, political and policy-oriented research on the analysis of the main trends of world development; and the Institute is unique in this way in our country. As time went by, the Institute gave birth to a series of problem-regional research institutions – the Institute for the USA and Canadian Studies, the Institute for African Studies, the Institute of the International Labor Movement, etc. However, IMEMO still remains one-of-a-kind in terms of the scale and complexity of the research on the scientific issues by the analytical center.

The Institute employs more than 318 researchers. Among them there are: 7 Members of the Academy of Sciences

It publishes the academic journal World Economy and International Relations.

IMEMO is the organizer of the international summit "Primakov Readings".

About the institute
The mission of the Institute is the elaboration of a reliable analytical basis for political decision-making. The Institute cooperates with federal and regional government bodies, mass media, major public and private companies. In its research, IMEMO takes an independent and uncommitted position.

The Institute carries out fundamental and applied researches in the following areas:

 theories of the world economy and international relations, new model of the global economic and political development;
 long-term institutional and structural changes in the world economy and in the international labour division, role and place of Russia in these processes;
 social factor and modern socio-political institutes in the world development;
 globalization and regional integration, optimization of Russia participation in the international economic relations;
 rends and prospects of innovation development as a major factor of the economic growth;
 economic, political and social development of the overseas countries and regions;
 formation and evolution of the system of international relations,  Russian role and place in it;
 international security and Russian national security;
 prevention and resolution of international conflicts, prevention of international terrorism;
 long- and short-term forecasts of global development.

IMEMO also takes an active part in:

 expert consulting on legislation, government policies, entrepreneurial strategies;
 world market research;
 consulting of Russian administrative and executive bodies;
 organizing and holding conferences and workshops, carrying out international study projects, maintaining links with international and foreign research institutions.

Primakov Readings 

"Primakov Readings" – is the international summit aimed at promoting dialogue on current global trends in the world economy, international politics and security among high-ranking experts, diplomats and decision-makers from around the Globe named in honor of the academician Yevgeny Primakov. The summit takes place annually in Moscow and is organized by IMEMO.

Divisions

 Department of Science and Innovation
 Department of Global Economic Problems and Foreign Economic Policy
 Department of Economic Theory
 World Economy Forecasting Section
 Department of International Capital Markets
 Center for Industrial and Investment Studies
 Center for Energy Research
 Center for Research in Transitional Economies
 Agribusiness Center
 Group for Analysis of Price formation, Inflation and Taxation
 Section of Economic Modeling
 Department of International Politics
 Section for Political Theory
 Center for International Security
 Center for North American Studies
 Center for European Studies
 Department for European Political Studies
 Center for Asia Pacific Studies
 Center for Development and Modernization Studies
 Center for Comparative Socio-Economic and Socio-Political Studies

Direction

Directors of the Institute

 1956–1965: 
 1965–1966:  (acting)
 1966–1982: Nikolai N. Inozemtsev
 1983–1985: Alexander Nikolaevich Yakovlev
 1985–1989: Yevgeny Primakov
 1989–2000: 
 2000–2006: 
 2006-2017: Alexander Dynkin (since 2016 - President)
 Since 2017:

External links

Further reading
 

Educational institutions established in 1956
Research institutes in the Soviet Union
Research institutes in Russia
Economic research institutes
Institutes of the Russian Academy of Sciences
1956 establishments in the Soviet Union
Economics schools